Daxing is a town under the administration of Du'an Yao Autonomous County, Guangxi, China. , it has 13 villages under its administration.

References 

Towns of Hechi
Du'an Yao Autonomous County